Bayt Thul was a Palestinian  village in the Jerusalem Subdistrict.  It was depopulated during the 1947–1948 Civil War in Mandatory Palestine on April 1, 1948, under Operation Nachshon. It was located 15.5 km west of Jerusalem.

History

Ottoman era
Bayt Thul, like the rest of  Palestine, was incorporated into the Ottoman Empire in 1517, and in the census of 1538–1539,   Bayt Tul was  noted in the Nahiya of Quds of the Liwa of Quds.  In the 1596 census, the village  had a population was 7 households, all Muslim. The villagers paid a fixed tax rate of 33,3% on various agricultural products, such as   wheat, barley, olive trees, in addition to "occasional revenues"; a total of  1,860  akçe.

In 1838,  it was noted as a   Muslim village in the district of Beni Malik, west of Jerusalem.

In the early 1870s   Clermont-Ganneau found the village inhabited, and a "hearty welcome was accorded to us." He further noted that the "village contains two welys, one the sanctuary of Sheikh Injeim, the other that of Bedriyeh. In front of the wely of Bedriyeh, I noticed the remains of a small aqueduct of masonry and two large shafts of ancient columns." According to local tradition, Bedriyeh was the sister of Sheikh Injeim.

He found remains there which led him to conclude that an important Christian building of the Byzantine  period  once existed there.

In 1883, the PEF's Survey of Western Palestine noted "Foundations and a Mukam."

British Mandate era
In the 1922 census of Palestine, conducted  by the British Mandate authorities,  there were 133 villagers, all Muslims,  increasing  in the  1931 census  to 182 inhabitants, in 43 inhabited houses.

In the  1945 statistics, the village had a population of 260 Muslims, with  a total of  4,629  dunums of land.  Of this, 55 dunams  were for  irrigable land or plantations, 787  for cereals,  while 13 dunams were built-up, urban,  land.

1948, aftermath
In late October, 1948, the Beit Horon Battalion  started the destruction of Bayt Thul.

When the writers of an oral Palestinian history collection returned with a villager to Bayt Thul, they recorded how she, Umm 'Ali, began to collect herbs and plants. “She continued picking the leaves until what she had clutched to her chest sprouted  from her like a large bush. That was Umm 'Ali, or maybe thats what we remember: A tree of wild herbs and greens moving with amazing grace over the stones of the destroyed villages, assuring, comforting, and reminding us of our descendants who are awaiting us.“

References

Bibliography

External links
Welcome To Bayt Thul
Survey of Western Palestine, Map 17:  IAA, Wikimedia commons 
Bayt Thul, Zochrot
Bayt Thul, from the Khalil Sakakini Cultural Center

Arab villages depopulated during the 1948 Arab–Israeli War
District of Jerusalem